Santiago Iván Acosta (born July 4, 1979) is an Argentine flyweight boxer. He is nicknamed "El Vendaval". As an amateur Acosta competed for his native country at the 2003 Pan American Games in Santo Domingo, Dominican Republic, where he was stopped in the second round of the men's flyweight division (– 51 kg) by Mexico's eventual bronze medalist Raúl Hilares. Acosta made his professional debut on April 21, 2004 against Juan Manuel Altamirano.

Professional career

On April 4, 2012, Acosta loss against Liborio Solis on a twelve round unanimous decision

Professional boxing record

References

1979 births
Living people
Argentine male boxers
Flyweight boxers
Boxers at the 2003 Pan American Games
Sportspeople from La Plata
South American Games silver medalists for Argentina
South American Games medalists in boxing
Competitors at the 2002 South American Games
Pan American Games competitors for Argentina